The 1999 Australian Drivers' Championship was a CAMS sanctioned motor racing title open to drivers of Formula Holden racing cars. The winner of the championship, which was the 43rd Australian Drivers' Championship, was awarded the 1999 CAMS Gold Star. Due to a sponsorship arrangement with Holden, the championship was promoted as the "Holden Australian Drivers' Championship".

The championship was won by Simon Wills driving a Reynard 94D for Birrana Racing Pty Ltd.

Schedule

The championship was contested over a seven-round series, with two races per round.

Points system
Championship points were awarded on a 20–15–12–10–8–6–4–3–2–1 basis to the top ten finishers in each race.

Championship results

Note:

% Contemporary Formula Holden regulations mandated the use of a 3.8 litre Holden V6 engine.

+ No points were awarded for the first race of Round 6 as the race was cancelled due to a series of accidents.

References

External links
 1999 Australian open wheeler images at autopics.com.au

Australian Drivers' Championship
Drivers' Championship
Formula Holden
Australian Drivers